The Metishto River is a tributary of the Grass River, which is, in turn a tributary of the Nelson River, that ultimately flows into Hudson Bay.  Its headwaters lie "a short distance from the northwest arm of Moose Lake".

The river runs parallel to railway from The Pas to Churchill, for much or its length.

In October 2018 a train operated by the Arctic Gateway Group derailed while crossing the river, releasing "liquid petroleum".

References

Rivers of Manitoba